Hymenopodidae is a family of the order Mantodea (mantises), which contains six subfamilies.  Some of the species in this family mimic flowers and are found camouflaged among them; these are called flower mantises. Their coloration is aggressive mimicry, luring prey to approach close enough to be seized and eaten.

Subfamilies, tribes and genera 
The Mantodea Species File lists:

Acromantinae
Auth: Giglio-Tos, 1919
 tribe Acromantini
 Acromantis Saussure, 1870
 Ambivia Stal, 1877
 Citharomantis Rehn, 1909
 Majangella Giglio-Tos, 1915
 Metacromantis Beier, 1930
 Oligomantis Giglio-Tos, 1915
 Parapsychomantis Shcherbakov, 2017
 Psychomantis Giglio-Tos, 1915
 Rhomantis Giglio-Tos, 1915
 tribe Otomantini
 Anasigerpes Giglio-Tos, 1915
 Chrysomantis Giglio-Tos, 1915
 Otomantis Bolivar, 1890
 Oxypiloidea Schulthess, 1898

Hymenopodinae
Auth: Giglio-Tos, 1919
 tribe Anaxarchini
 Anaxarcha Stal, 1877
 Euantissa Giglio-Tos, 1927
 Heliomantis Giglio-Tos, 1915
 Nemotha Wood-Mason, 1884
 Odontomantis Saussure, 1871
 Werneriana Shcherbakov, Ehrmann & Borer, 2016
 tribe Hymenopodini
 Chlidonoptera Karsch, 1892
 Chloroharpax Werner, 1908
 Creobroter (Westwood, 1889)
 Helvia Stal, 1877
 Hymenopus (Serville, 1831)
 Panurgica Karsch, 1896
 Pseudocreobotra Saussure, 1870
 Theopropus Saussure, 1898

Oxypilinae
Auth: Giglio-Tos, 1919
 tribe Hestiasulini
 Astyliasula Schwarz & Shcherbakov, 2017
 Catestiasula Giglio-Tos, 1915
 Ephestiasula Giglio-Tos, 1915
 Hestiasula Saussure, 1871
 Pseudohestiasula' Schwarz & Shcherbakov, 2017
 tribe Oxypilini
 Ceratomantis Wood-Mason, 1876
 Junodia Schulthess-Rechberg, 1899
 Oxypilus Serville, 1831
 Pachymantis Saussure, 1871
 Pseudoxypilus Giglio-Tos, 1915
Phyllocraniinae
Africa:
 Phyllocrania Burmeister, 1838
Phyllothelyinae

South-East Asia:
 tribe Parablepharini
 Parablepharis Saussure, 1870
 tribe Phyllothelyini
 Ceratocrania Westwood, 1889
 Phyllothelys Wood-Mason, 1877

Sibyllinae
Africa:
 Leptosibylla Roy, 1996
 Presibylla Bolivar, 1908
 Sibylla'' Stal, 1856

NB: The Epaphroditinae Giglio-Tos, 1915 (from the Caribbean) are now placed in a separate family Epaphroditidae.

Gallery

See also
 List of mantis genera and species

References

External links

Tree of Life - Hymenopodidae

 
Mantodea families